Vöcklabruck is the administrative center of the Vöcklabruck district, Austria. It is located in the western part of Upper Austria, close to the A1 Autobahn as well as the B1 highway.

Vöcklabruck's name derives from the River Vöckla which runs through the town, whose name in turn originates from a person's name ('Vechela') and 'Ache', meaning 'flowing water' or 'river'.

Vöcklabruck has many shops as well as services and schools. It was chosen for Europäisches Schützentreffen (the European Meeting of Marksmen) in 2003, and has and will play host to other events such as the Internationale Musiktage (International Music Gathering), Landesgartenschau (provincial garden show) 2007, and an Erdbeerfest (strawberry festival), among others.

Population

Sights

Near the town there are many recreational facilities where people can enjoy both indoor and outdoor activities. Alongside these, Vöcklabruck offers:

 In the town square's tower, frescos discovered in the 1960s. They date from 1502 and were painted by Tyrolean Jörg Kölderer.
 Dörflkirche/Ägidiuskirche''' (St. Giles' Church), Baroque church constructed between 1688–1691.
 Schöndorfer Kirche, an early medieval fortified church, built before 824.
 Museum Heimathaus'' with Wolfsegg Iron

Personalities related to Vöcklabruck

 Leonhard Schiemer (born around 1500–1528), important figure in the Anabaptist movement
 Emilie Mediz-Pelikan (1861–1908), landscape painter
 Oskar Czerwenka (1924–2000), a bass whose residence was expanded to a state music school named after him
 Werner Kreindl (1927–1992), Austrian actor (among other things, student Gerber)
 Gerhard Narholz (born 1937), production music composer/conductor,
 Jim Silye (born 1946), Canadian politician, businessman and former sportsman (football) emigrated to Canada in 1951
 Wolfgang Holzmair (born 1952), renowned baritone recitalist and opera singer
Franzobel (=Stefan Griebl, born 1967), writer
 David Six (born 1985), musician
 Peter Hackmair (born 1987), Austrian footballer
 Lukas Pöstlberger (born 1992), Austrian cyclist
 Princess Alexandra of Hanover, the daughter of Ernst August, Prince of Hanover and Caroline, Princess of Hanover
 Laura Wienroither (born 1999), Austrian footballer for the Austria women's national football team and Arsenal W.F.C.

International relations

Twin towns — Sister cities
Vöcklabruck is twinned with:

 Český Krumlov, Czech Republic
 Hauzenberg, Bavaria, Germany
 Slovenj Gradec, Slovenia

References

External links

 Official website  
 Webcam of Vöcklabruck

Cities and towns in Vöcklabruck District